The R. H. Stearns Building is an 11-story residence building (with shops at ground level) at 140 Tremont Street in Boston. It was built in 1909 for the businessman R. H. Stearns and his company and was the home of the R. H. Stearns and Company department store until the company's demise in 1978.

The Stearns store had been in many locations in Boston before finally settling in its new building and headquarters at 140 Tremont Street.

Since 1886 Stearns & Co. occupied and leased a re-modeled building on the site of the old Boston Masonic Temple, until it was completely torn down and the new R. H. Stearns building put up in 1908.

R. H. Stearns & Company ceased operations in 1978, and the building was converted to 140 studio and one-bedroom apartments for older adults and people with disabilities. The building was added to the National Register of Historic Places as R. H. Stearns House in 1980.

See also
 National Register of Historic Places listings in northern Boston, Massachusetts

References

Images

External links

Residential buildings on the National Register of Historic Places in Massachusetts
Beaux-Arts architecture in Massachusetts
Buildings and structures completed in 1909
Financial District, Boston
Buildings and structures in Boston
National Register of Historic Places in Boston